Lpod (also written lpOD) is a project's name acronym for languages & platforms for OpenDocument. The lpOD Project develops a set of multilanguage tools around the OpenDocument Format (ODF) standard.

The project was founded by four French companies and four French public laboratories in 2008. It received funding by the French National Research Agency and was awarded the official label of the Cap Digital competitivity cluster.

Technology 
The lpod project aims to develop a library implementing the ODF standard in extenso, that is, in the most complete way possible. On top of this library the project aims to build three high-level APIs, one in Python, another one in Perl and the third one in Ruby. In May 2010, the version 0,9 of the Python API and early versions of the Perl API were available.

Improvements to the ODF specification 
Several members of the project are working on improvement proposals for the ODF standard, mostly in two specific areas: security and accessibility.

Potential uses 
The three APIs and the ODF library are meant to be used in scientific and industrial contexts. As the library itself departs from the traditional productivity suite software it focuses on large volume data handling, enabling the development of tools for data mining specific to scientific and business intelligence uses. APIs already come with specific tools such as format conversion and styles inspection and manipulation.

Licenses 
Software developed by the lpod project is available under two free software licenses, namely the GPL v3 and the Apache v2. Copyright is owned collectively by the four companies.

References

External links
 Link to the official description of the project by the French National Research Agency (french)
 Description of the project by the Cap Digital competitivity cluster (french)
 Perl CPAN distribution
 Python Package Index distribution
 odfdo (derivative work of the lpod-python project)

OpenDocument
Open formats
Markup languages
Computer file formats